Julian Dana William McMahon (born 27 July 1968) is an Australian-American actor and former model. He is the only son of former Prime Minister of Australia, Sir William McMahon. He is best known for his roles as Detective John Grant in Profiler, Cole Turner in Charmed, Christian Troy in Nip/Tuck, Doctor Doom in the Fantastic Four franchise, Jonah in Runaways, and Jess LaCroix in CBS crime drama FBI: Most Wanted.

Early life
McMahon was born in Sydney, the son of Sir William McMahon, a prominent Australian politician, and Lady McMahon (née Sonia Hopkins), an heiress, socialite and fashion icon. His father was a Member of the Australian House of Representatives and a high-ranking minister in the 24-year Liberal Government for many years before Julian's birth; he became the 20th Prime Minister of Australia in March 1971, when Julian was two years old. His mother left their three children in the care of a nanny to be with her husband in Canberra during his Prime Ministership. He has an older sister, Melinda, and a younger sister, Deborah. He is of Irish descent through his father.

In an interview with the Herald Sun in 2018, McMahon discussed his childhood; "My Dad... was born in 1908. That’s a very different time to what it was when he was raising me. He must have gone through a strange misunderstanding of how you were parented in 1908 versus how you parent in 1972; it would have been so conflicting. Also how you be a husband in that period of time would have been different."

McMahon was educated at the private, boys-only, Sydney Grammar School, which his father had attended. As a child he dreamed of being an army cadet and playing rugby. McMahon briefly studied law at the University of Sydney and economics at the University of Wollongong. McMahon found no interest in his studies, and began a modelling career. He became known as a model in various fashion capitals, such as Milan, London, New York City, Rome, and Paris.

McMahon was working in Europe when his father died, and returned to Australia for the funeral. While home, he filmed some Levi's commercials which helped him land a role on the iconic Australian soap opera Home & Away.

Career
McMahon won recognition for his roles in television dramas, in portrayals of Ben Lucini in the Australian soap opera Home and Away (1989–1991), Detective John Grant in the American crime drama Profiler (1996-2000), Cole Turner in the American supernatural drama Charmed (2000–2003), and Christian Troy in the American medical drama Nip/Tuck (2003–2010). He also appeared in films with leading and supporting roles, such as Chasing Sleep (2000) alongside Jeff Daniels, Doctor Doom in the Fantastic Four franchise (2005 and 2007), Premonition (2007) starring alongside Sandra Bullock, Red (2010) alongside Bruce Willis, Faces in the Crowd (2011) alongside Milla Jovovich, and Bait (2012) alongside Dan Wyllie and Xavier Samuel.

In the early 1990s, McMahon struggled to obtain a work permit for the United States and as a result he missed out on a few roles. McMahon's big break Hollywood role was on the soap opera Another World when he was cast as Ian Rain in 1993. The first scene he shot in New York for the show had him emerge from a pool in a speedo at the Cory Mansion. He remembers the experience as "pretty magical".

McMahon's work in television, particularly with Nip/Tuck and Charmed garnered him more success. The former series won an Emmy Award and a Golden Globe Award. McMahon played the lead role in Nip/Tuck, alongside Dylan Walsh throughout the entire series' run. He also played Jonah on Marvel's Runaways.

In 2018, McMahon returned to Australia to film Swinging Safari in Queensland, alongside Guy Pearce, Kylie Minogue, Radha Mitchell, Asher Keddie, and Jeremy Sims. The film is set in the 1970s and sees McMahon sport handlebar moustache. McMahon and his ex-sister-in-law Kylie Minogue share an improvised kiss in a scene where couples partner swap. He stated that he found it difficult speaking with an Australian accent in the movie because the majority of his career he has adapted to performing with an American accent.

From 2020 to 2022, McMahon starred as Jess LaCroix for more than two seasons on the CBS crime drama FBI: Most Wanted. He stated that when he received the script for the series from CBS, he had an "aha moment" and knew he had to play the character. His final episode, "Shattered", aired March 8, 2022.

Most of McMahon's roles have been villains or damaged characters which he says he feels attracted to.

Personal life
McMahon jokingly noted in an interview with Jimmy Kimmel that his mother [was] "a very scary lady" because she would visit him on the set of his films and critique his performance when he finished a scene.

In 1994, McMahon married singer Danni Minogue after meeting on the set of Home & Away in 1991. He starred in her music video clip for the single "This Is It", a song that summed up the couple's relationship and hopes for the future. The newlyweds spent a great deal of their marriage apart due to McMahon pursuing his career in Los Angeles and Minogue in England. They divorced after 18 months with Minogue stating that her negative relationship with McMahon's mother, Lady Sonia McMahon, being an issue from the beginning.

In 1999 McMahon married Baywatch star Brooke Burns and had a daughter, before divorcing in 2001. McMahon married for the third time in 2014 to Kelly Paniagua.

McMahon has resided in USA since the 1990s, but says his soul is still Australian: "I feel like I'm Australian on the inside and American on the outside or something. I would never want to leave it behind either. I love Australians, Australianisms, I love my part of being Australian. I love where I grew up and how I grew up and, you know, I wouldn't change it for the world."

Filmography

Film

Television

Video games

Awards and nominations

References

External links

 
 Julian McMahon on Yahoo! Movies

1968 births
American male film actors
American male models
American male soap opera actors
American male video game actors
American male voice actors
American people of Australian descent
American people of Irish descent
Australian male film actors
Australian male models
Australian male soap opera actors
Australian male video game actors
Australian male voice actors
Australian people of Irish descent
Australian expatriate male actors in the United States
Children of prime ministers of Australia
Living people
Models from Sydney
Naturalized citizens of the United States
Actresses from Sydney
University of Wollongong alumni
People educated at Sydney Grammar School
20th-century American male actors
21st-century American male actors
20th-century Australian male actors
21st-century Australian male actors